The Danish Women's Handball League is the top professional league for Danish women's handball clubs. It is administered by the Danish Handball Federation, and the winners are recognized as Danish champions. The league is officially called Bambusa Kvindeligaen for sponsorship reasons. It has previously been known as HTH GO Ligaen, Primo Tours Ligaen, Boxer Dameligaen, TOMS Ligaen and GuldBageren Ligaen. The current title holder is Odense Håndbold (2022). The European Handball Federation (EHF) ranks the Danish league 4th in the coefficients of leagues based on performances in European competitions over the past seasons.

Competition format 
The Danish Women's Handball League shares the season style with the men's league. It consists of 14 teams, each playing 26 regular season games. The eight best teams of the regular season advance to further games, where they are divided into two groups of four teams each. No. 1 and 2 from the regular season start with 2 points. No. 3 and 4 start with 1 point, while no. 5-8 start with no points. After these six games the two top teams in each group will play semifinals. No. 1 from one group is up against no. 2 from the other. The winners will meet in finals, while the losers will play against each other for the bronze medal. Semifinals, finals, and bronze games are all played in best of 3.

The lowest placed team of the regular season is directly relegated to the second-best division, and replaced by the winner of this. The teams finishing as 9, 10, 11, 12 and 13 are put in a group where they will play against each other. In the second-best division, the teams that end up 2nd and 3rd will play against each other in best of 3. The winner of those games will get to meet the lowest placed team from the 9-13 group from the top league, yet again in best of 3. The winner will get to play in the top league next season, while the loser plays in the second-best division.

Seasons

Current teams (2022/23)

The fourteen teams of the 2021/22 season are:

Champions
The complete list of champions since 1936:

Medal table 
The all-time medal table for the women's championship is as follows:

Top scorers 
The following list shows the top scorers from recent seasons:
 2000/01: Mette Vestergaard, FIF (133)
 2001/02: Camilla Andersen, Slagelse FH (181)
 2002/03: Camilla Andersen, Slagelse FH (215)
 2003/04: Bojana Petrović, Slagelse FH (175)
 2004/05: Bojana Popović, Slagelse FH (174)
 2005/06: Tanja Milanović, Ikast-Bording EH (172)
 2006/07: Mette Sjøberg, FCK Håndbold (167)
 2007/08: Nadine Krause, FCK Håndbold (153)
 2008/09: Grit Jurack, Viborg HK (125)
 2011/12: Mette Gravholt, Team Tvis Holstebro (141)
 2012/13: Estavana Polman, SønderjyskE Damer (138)
 2013/14: Estavana Polman, Team Esbjerg (152)
 2014/15: Jette Hansen, Silkeborg-Voel KFUM (157)
 2015/16: Nathalie Hagman, Team Tvis Holstebro (191)
 2016/17: Trine Troelsen, Silkeborg-Voel KFUM (199)
 2017/18: Ida Bjørndalen Karlsson, Team Esbjerg (168)
 2018/19: Laura Damgaard Lund, EH Aalborg (158)
 2019/20: Mia Rej, København Håndbold (170)
 2020/21: Kristina Jørgensen, Viborg HK (180)
 2021/22: Mathilde Neesgaard, Aarhus United (179)

Statistics

EHF coefficients

The following data indicates Danish coefficient rankings between European handball leagues.

Country ranking
EHF League Ranking for 2022/23 season:

1.  (1)  Nemzeti Bajnokság I (157.67)
2.  (5)   Ligue Butagaz Énergie (118.50) 
3.  (2)  Russian Superleague (114.50) 
4.  (3)  Bambusa Kvindeligaen (109.00)
5.  (6)   REMA 1000-ligaen (102.17)
6.  (4)  Liga Națională (94.50)

Broadcasting rights
TV2 Danmark
TV2 Sport

In European competitions

See also

Women's sports
Danish Handball League

References 

 
Women's handball in Denmark
Women's handball leagues
Professional sports leagues in Denmark
Women's sports leagues in Denmark